The Northern Chanyu (reigned 89–91) was an unnamed and obscure chanyu or ruler of the Xiongnu who lived in the 1st century CE.

In February 91, he was defeated by Geng Kui during the Battle of the Altai Mountains, on an expedition sent by Dou Xian. His younger brother Yuchujian Chanyu (reigned 91–93) was his sole heir, but was killed by generals Ren Shang and Wang Fu in 93.

According to the Book of Wei, the remnants of Northern Chanyu's tribe, whom Lev Gumilyov termed "Weak Xiongnu", settled, as Yueban (悅般), near Kucha and Wusun; while the rest fled across the Altai mountains towards Kangju.

Footnotes

References

Bichurin N.Ya., "Collection of information on peoples in Central Asia in ancient times", vol. 1, Sankt Petersburg, 1851, reprint Moscow-Leningrad, 1950

Taskin B.S., "Materials on Sünnu history", Science, Moscow, 1968, p. 31 (In Russian)

Han dynasty
Chanyus
1st-century monarchs in Asia
Unidentified people